People for Real, Open and United Democracy, abbreviated to PROUD, was a political party in Bulgaria. It was formed by Slavcho Binev MEP on 22 April 2012, after Binev left the nationalist party Attack, for whom he had been elected to the European Parliament in 2007.
In 2013 Binev's PROUD formed a pre-election coalition with 3 other political formations.

Footnotes

Conservative parties in Bulgaria
Eurosceptic parties in Bulgaria
Political parties established in 2012
2012 establishments in Bulgaria
National conservative parties
Nationalist parties in Bulgaria